Mont Saint Michel is an island off the coast of Normandy, France.

Mont Saint Michel may refer to:
 Mont-Saint-Michel Abbey, the abbey on the island
 Mont-Saint-Michel Bay, which surrounds the island
 Mont Saint-Michel (Alsace), a hill in the Vosges, France
 Mont-Saint-Michel, Quebec, a municipality in Canada
 St Michael's Mount, the island off the coast of Cornwall, England
 , a ferry operated by Brittany Ferries